María Amalia Matamoros Solís is a Costa Rican beauty queen who won the Miss World Costa Rica 2008 pageant and went on to represent her country in Miss World 2008 in Johannesburg, South Africa, on December 13, 2008. She was not among the fifteen semi-finalists.

She began her career in 2008 when she won the Miss Teen ExpoWorld pageant. She has also competed in Miss Latin America 2008, where she was a top twelve finalist, and Miss Continente Americano 2009, where she was unplaced. On October 29, 2009, she represented Costa Rica in Reina Hispanoamericana 2009 in Santa Cruz, Bolivia, winning the Miss Photogenic title.

After years of absence from beauty contests, she took part in the Miss Costa Rica 2014 pageant, where she represented Alajuela Province. She finished in the top five and won the special prize "Reto Saba Multi Estilo". She competed again two years later in the 2016 edition, where she was unplaced.

In October 2017, she was the representative of Costa Rica in Miss Grand International 2017, held at the Vinpearl Convention Center in Phú Quốc Island, Vietnam. On October 12, she caused a sensation during the national costume competition with an outfit inspired by traditional Boruca masks that featured a feathered wooden headdress entirely hand-carved by the Boruca, although it was so huge that it slipped off her head during her performance. During the evening gown competition held on October 23, she unintentionally garnered the attention of the media because of her fall on stage after she tripped on the hem of her long dress. The video of her fall went viral and got more than 100,000 views on YouTube. Although it likely contributed to her loss, she ultimately placed in the Top 20 and won the "Best in Swimsuit" prize.

References

1989 births
Living people
People from Grecia (canton)
Miss World 2008 delegates
Miss International 2011 delegates
Costa Rican beauty pageant winners